Patrizia Siorpaes married Tara (born 5 April 1957) is a former Italian World Cup alpine ski racer who was 20th in slalom at the World Ski Championships 1974.

Biography
In the 1970s she was the girlfriend of the blue avalanche skier Paolo De Chiesa.

World Championships results

References

External links
 Patrizia Siorpaes at Voci di Cortina 

1957 births
Living people
Italian female alpine skiers